(), also called , and sometimes referred as "Swallow-tailed Hems and Flying Ribbons clothing" or "swallow tail" clothing for short in English, is a form of set of attire in  which was worn by Chinese women. It was a common form of aristocratic costumes in the Han and Wei dynasties and was also a style of formal attire for elite women.

The  was multi-layered and was decorated with an apron-like decorative cloth at the waist with triangular-strips at the bottom and with pieces of ribbons worn underneath the apron which would hung down from the waist. The popularity of ribbons later fell and the decorative hems were eventually enlarged.  

This form of attire also spread to Goguryeo, where it is depicted in the tomb murals found in the Anak Tomb No.3.

Terminology 

History 
The term  was recorded prior to the Han dynasty in the Ode to Goddess written by Song Yu, a Chinese poet from the late Warring States Period, which demonstrates that the  originated earlier than the Han dynasty.

Han dynasty 
In the Han dynasty, the silk decorations were cut into the shapes of arch; these originated from the  recorded in the Rites of Zhou. The  was popular in the Han dynasty, but its popularity started to fade in the late Eastern Han dynasty.

Wei, Jin, Northern and Southern dynasties 

On the whole, the costumes of the Wei and Jin period still followed the patterns of Qin and Han dynasties. However, the clothing of women in this period were generally large and loose. The carefree lifestyle brought about the development of women's garments in the direction of extravagant and ornate beauty. This carefree lifestyle, which was reflected in the garment and apparel of the people living in this period, can be explained by the historical circumstances which impacted the mood of the people: during the Northern and Southern dynasties was a period of volatility, the barbarians invaded Central Plain, thus, various wars and battles occurred. The once dominant laws and orders collapsed, so did the once unchallenged power of Confucianism. At the meantime, the philosophy of Laozi and Zhuangzi became popular. Buddhist scriptures were translated, Taoism was developed, and Humanitarian ideology emerged among the aristocrats. However, all these posed a threat to the conservative and imperial power, which tried to crush them by force. These policies forced these scholars to seek comfort and relief in life. They were interested in various kinds of philosophy and studied a lot of the "mysterious learning". They preferred a life of truth and freedom. They dressed themselves in free and casual elegance.
The  (or ), which was worn in the Wei, Jin, Northern, and Southern dynasties, was quite different from the style worn in the Han dynasty.

The  are depicted with in the paintings of Gu Kaizhi. The  eventually became more popular than the  during this period as the set of attire  itself had become more popular. 

The  also evolved in terms of shape in the Northern and Southern dynasties when the long ribbons were no longer seen and the swallow-tailed corner became bigger; as a result the flying ribbons and the swallow-tailed corners were combined into one. These changes can be found in the paintings Wise and Benevolent Women and Nymph of the Luo River by Gu Kaizhi, as well as the lacquered paintings unearthed from the Sima Jinlong tomb in Datong and the Goguryeo tomb murals from the Anak Tomb No. 3.

Construction and Formation 
The Shao refers to pieces of silk cloth sewn onto the lower hem of the dress, which were wide at the top and narrow at the bottom, so that triangles were formed overlapping each other. "Xian" refers to some relatively long, silk ribbons which extended from the short-cut skirt. While the wearer was walking, these lengthy ribbons made the sharp corners and the lower hem wave like a flying swallow, hence the Chinese phrase "beautiful ribbons and flying swallowtail".

The sleeves were broad and fringed at the cuffs with decorative borders of a different colour. The skirt had spaced coloured stripes and was tied with a white silk band at the waist. There was also an apron between the upper garment and skirt for the purpose of fastening the waist. Apart from wearing a multi-coloured skirt, women also wore other kinds such as the crimson gauze-covered skirt, the red-blue striped gauze double skirt, and the barrel-shaped red gauze skirt. Many of these styles are mentioned in historical records. Wide sleeves and long robes, flying ribbons and floating skirts, elegant and majestic hair ornaments, all these became the fashion style of Wei and Jin female appearance.

During the Northern and Southern dynasties, the  underwent further changes in style. The long flying ribbons were no longer seen and the swallow-tailed corners became enlarged; as a result, the flying ribbons and swallow-tailed corners were combined into one.

Influences and derivatives

Goguryeo 
Depictions of women wearing  can also be found in Goguryeo tomb murals, as found in the Anak Tomb No.3. The wife of the tomb owner of Anak Tomb No.3 dresses in Chinese , which may indicate the clothing style worn in the Six dynasties. The tomb belongs to a male refugee called Dong Shou (died in 357 AD) who fled from Liaotong to Goguryeo according to Chinese scholar Yeh Pai, a conclusion which is also accepted in the formal Korean report issued in 1958 although some Korean scholars believe the tomb to belong to King Mi-chon.

Gallery

See also 
Paofu
Hanfu
Hanfu movement
List of Hanfu
Hanfu accessories

References 

Chinese traditional clothing